Play Entertainment is a Pakistani entertainment and lifestyle channel which is owned by Business Recorder Group. It is geared towards the youth of today and engages the audience, to be informative while challenging norms, sharing new perspectives and inspiring change, whether it's through the content of a program or its creative visualization.

History 

Play TV was a music channel that was revamped to Play Max as an entertainment channel in 2014 but again changed its logo and design. Play Max had a tag line Jee Bhar Ke Dekho. In 2015 Play Max was redesigned again as Play Entertainment. Now the programming content of Play Entertainment consists of mainly local Pakistani content.
Its parent TV network AAJ News also has an exclusive license for Aaj Entertainment. Waqar Zaka joined Play Entertainment in 2015 as executive director.

Current Programs

Comedy
 OoLala Show
 Hashmat and Family
 Saba Easyload Wali
 Ready Steady Go

Drama Serials
 Aankhon Ke Sagar
 Naadaan Mohabbat
 Mere Mehram
 Ankahee Dastaan
 Bezaban Ishq

Formerly Shows

Comedy
Apna Tou Style Yehi Hai
Desi Burger
Haste Gaal
Meri Shaadi Karwao
My Modern Family
 Peek-A-Boo Shahwaiz
 Ready Steady Go
Tere Naal Luv Hogaya
Yeh Laga Sixer

Dramas
Ashkbaar
Chahiye Thora Pyaar
Do Tola Pyaar
Faraib
Khatakaar
Teri Khudgarzi
Main Mohabbat Aur Tum
Mohabbat Tu Jane Na
Muntazir
Sawal-E-Ishq
 Tasveer
Tera Mera Pyaar

Horror
Mera Saya

Talk Shows
Choti Car Bara Star
Ehsaan Ramzan 
Iftar With Asad
Tashreef Talk
Live With Play
Tube Light
Gupshup Morning Show
Gupshup
Style And U

Films 

 Haseena Tu Deewana Mein
 Ishqq Achank

See also
List of Pakistani television stations

References

Television networks in Pakistan
Television stations in Karachi
Television channels and stations established in 2015